Mwami Mutaga III Senyamwiza Mutamo was the king of Burundi from 1739 to 1767. He died in Butare. He succeeded king Mwezi III Ndagushimiye.

Burundian kings
18th-century monarchs in Africa